John Arthur Mogale Maimane (5 October 1932 – 28 June 2005), better known as Arthur Maimane, was a South African journalist and novelist.

Biography
Maimane was born in Pretoria, growing up in the black township of Lady Selborne. He was educated at St Peter's College, Johannesburg, also known as the "Black Eton" of South Africa (Oliver Tambo was his mathematics teacher before becoming a lawyer and president of the African National Congress). Maimane was originally intending to study medicine, when a young priest, Trevor Huddleston (who was involved in the Sophiatown forced removals), persuaded him to take a vacation job at Drum magazine. As a result, Maimane choose journalism as his life career. He was a versatile journalist for Drum, covering a wide spectrum of subjects, including writing sports reports, thriller and interviews with beauty queens and other celebrities.

Reporter
Joining Drum in the early 1950s, he was mentored by Henry Nxumalo. The photograph of Maimane in Anthony Sampson's 1956 book Drum: A Venture into the New Africa, "trilby on back of head, cigarette dangling", is an amusing take-off of the Hollywood "newshound" image, but conceals his innate seriousness as a reporter and analyst of the world around him.

Under the pseudonym Arthur Mogale, he wrote a regular series for Drum entitled "The Chief", in which he described gangster incidents he had heard about in the shebeens. Don Mattera, a leading Sophiatown gangster, took exception to this: "The gangsters were pissed off with him and there was a word out that we should wipe this guy off."

Maimane moved to Golden City Post, Drum magazine's sister daily paper, as the news editor but did not stay long. In 1958, the year after his friend Nxumalo was murdered by unknown assailants, Maimane moved to Ghana to work on the West African edition of Drum. In 1961, he moved to London. The young editor accepted a position at Reuters and was posted to Dar es Salaam in Tanzania as its East African correspondent. There he met his second wife, Jenny, and, when he was deported from Tanzania after refusing the founding editorship of TANU's new daily and for critically reporting political events, they both returned to London, England.

He worked for the BBC African Service at Bush House for a while, and then moved to ITN. In 1976 his novel Victims was published in London by Allison and Busby but was banned in South Africa, although the English Academy of South Africa awarded Maimane its Pringle Award for Creative Writing in 1978.

After the 1994 elections in South Africa, he returned and was appointed Features editor of the liberal Weekly Mail. After a brief return to England, he was appointed editor of the Star, South Africa’s biggest daily (1994–97).

In 2001, Maimane and his wife returned to London.

His novel Victims was republished in 2000 as Hate No More. His post-apartheid play, Hang On In There, Nelson, was performed at the Windybrow Theatre in Johannesburg and at the State Theatre in Pretoria, in 1996.

Maimane died in 2005 in London, aged 72.

Books

 Hate No More, Kwela Books, 2000, . (Original version: Allison & Busby, 1976, under the title Victims)
 Victims, London: Allison & Busby, 1976.  (Winner of the English Academy of South Africa’s Pringle Award for Creative Writing in 1978).

See also

 List of South African writers

Further reading

 Mike Nicol, A Good-Looking Corpse: The World of Drum - Jazz and Gangsters, Hope and Defiance in the Townships of South Africa, London: Secker & Warburg, 1991, 
 Anthony Sampson, Drum: A Venture into the New Africa, London: Hodder & Stoughton, 1983,

References

External links
 Denis Herbstein, "Arthur Maimane" (obituary), The Guardian, 15 July 2005.

1932 births
2005 deaths
South African journalists
South African male novelists
People from Pretoria
20th-century South African novelists
South African dramatists and playwrights
South African emigrants to the United Kingdom
20th-century South African male writers
20th-century journalists